A Waltz for Grace is the debut album by English saxophonist Steve Williamson that was released on the Verve label in 1990.

Reception
AllMusic awarded the album with 3 stars and its review by Scott Yanow states: "At 25, Williamson displayed an original tenor sound and, although some of his soloing is in the Greg Osby/Gary Thomas 'M-Base' mode, he was not limited to that abstract style of improvising". The Penguin Guide review says: "What is lastingly impressive about A Waltz for Grace is its tremendous rhythmic variety. 'Groove Thang' (a UK recorded soprano-percussion duet) leads directly into the fuller-sounding 'Synthesis' from New York, both largely dependent on Williamson's ability to balance a line over a jolting, staccato pulse".

Track listing
All compositions by Steve Williamson except where noted.

 "Down (Slang)" – 3:18
 "Awakening" – 4:35
 "Visions" (Stevie Wonder) – 4:29
 "A Waltz for Grace" – 4:15
 "Mandy's Mood" – 5:49
 "Soon Come" – 4:14
 "Straight Ahead" – 4:45
 "Mandela" – 4:29
 "Groove Thang" – 1:42
 "Synthesis" – 4:59
 "Hummingbird" – 5:41
 "How High the Bird" – 4:22
 "Words Within Words" – 5:01

Personnel
Steve Williamson – all saxophones
Mark Mondesir – drums
Lonnie Plaxico – bass
Gary Crosby – bass
Dave Gilmore – guitar
Hawi Gondwe – guitar
Julian Joseph – piano
Abbey Lincoln – vocals on "A Waltz for Grace"

References

1989 debut albums
Steve Williamson albums